Datong Yungang Airport  is an airport serving the city of Datong in Shanxi Province, China.  It is located north of the town of Beijiazao in Datong County, 15.2 kilometers from the city center.

Construction of Datong Airport began in 2001 with a total investment of 290 million yuan, and the airport was opened in January 2006.  The airport's expansion was completed in 2013. The flight area of the airport is civil 4C. The runway is 3000 meters long and 60 meters wide. It can take off and land models below B737-800 (inclusive) and A321 (inclusive). There are two existing terminals, T1 International (6328.2 square meters) and T2 Domestic (10854 square meters), with a total area of 17182.2 square meters; apron area of 37,950 square meters, which can park 7 aircraft (6C, 1B) at the same time; parking The field area is 31255 square meters; it can meet the aviation demand of an annual passenger throughput of 900,000 passengers, a peak hour of 518 passengers, and a cargo and mail throughput of 4,700 tons.  Originally called Datong Beijiazao Airport (大同倍加造机场), it was renamed to Yungang in August 2012, after the nearby Yungang Grottoes, a World Heritage Site and popular tourist attraction.

In 2019, Datong Airport operated 23 domestic routes and 2 international routes with 13 Chinese domestic airlines (Air China, United Airlines, Eastern Airlines, Guilin Airlines, Sichuan Airlines, China Southern Airlines, Lucky Air, Tianjin Airlines, Shandong Airlines, Shenzhen Airlines, Long Dragon Airlines, Kunming Airlines, and China Airlines). For domestic routes, there are 29 domestic cities including Beijing, Taiyuan, Tianjin, and Qinhuangdao in North China; Shanghai, Xiamen, Hangzhou, Nanjing, Hefei, Jinan, and Qingdao in East China; Harbin, Shenyang, Dalian in Northeast China; Wuhan, Guilin, Changsha, Guangzhou, and Guangzhou in Central South China. Shenzhen, Haikou, and Zhengzhou; Yinchuan, Xi'an, Lanzhou, Xining, Ürümqi in the northwest region; Chengdu, Kunming, and Chongqing in the southwest region. Two international routes go to Southeast Asian countries, Siem Reap, Cambodia, and Bangkok, Thailand.

Airlines and destinations

See also
Datong Huairen Airport
List of airports in China
List of the busiest airports in China

References

2006 establishments in China
Airports established in 2006
Airports in Shanxi
Buildings and structures in Datong